Thamudic B is a Central Semitic language and script concentrated in northwestern Arabia, with attestations in Syria, Egypt, and Yemen. A single Thamudic B text mentions the king of Babylon, which suggests that it was composed before the fall of the kingdom, in the middle of the 6th century BCE.

Characteristics
 The suffix morpheme of the prefix conjugation in the first person is -t, as in Arabic and Northwest Semitic, as opposed to the -k of Ancient South Arabian and Ethiopic.
 The dative preposition is nm, which appears to be an assimilated form of an original *lima.
 The consonant /n/ often assimilates to a following contiguous consonant, ʔṯt, from earlier *ʾVnṯat and ʔt, from earlier *[ʔanta].
 Imperatives are often augmented by the energic suffix -n.

References

Arabic languages
Ancient North Arabian